One Woman's Journey Tour was the eighth concert tour by Australian singer Olivia Newton-John. It promoted her seventeenth studio album, Back with a Heart. The tour was announced after the success of the Greatest Hits Tour, and had 30 dates across the United States.

Background
The song "The Long and Winding Road" was performed as a tribute to Linda McCartney who died of breast cancer in 1998 (her husband, Paul, originally wrote the song for The Beatles). The songs "The Flower That Shattered the Stone" and "(They Long to Be) Close to You", are respectively tributes to the Columbine High School massacre victims and Olivia's deceased personal friend, Karen Carpenter (the song was made famous by the duo Carpenters).

The tour band was the same formed for the John Farnham tour shows (Newton-John performed with Farnham on their The Main Event Tour). Newton-John also talked about her battle against the breast cancer during the 1990s, which originated the names of this tour and her sixteenth studio album, Gaia: One Woman's Journey.

Critical response
The One Woman's Journey Tour received generally positive feedback from critics. Lisa Jann from The Seattle Times wrote: "Sticking with signature songs and old favorites, the Aussie princess of '70s pop and Grease icon surprised with a fun song list that spanned the entirety of her career, her ever-pleasant charisma, and her sweet voice, which sounded as fresh as ever". Kevin C. Johnson from St. Louis Post-Dispatch commented that "[...] One of the better nostalgia tours to catch this summer is Olivia Newton-John's low-profile trek, which drew a crowd of respectable size to Riverport Amphitheatre on Saturday night". The Kansas City Star published a mixed review, writing: "The singer has taken her knocks, some of them well-deserved, for bland interpretations of some mindless pop melodies. If white bread could sing, the classic put-down goes, it would sound like Olivia Newton-John". Thomas Kintner from Hartford Courant stated that: "[The] most important to the two-hour, 27-song show was that none of it seemed dated, not its hardly-looking-50 star, not her still-clarion voice, and not its songs". John Curran from The Press of Atlantic City wrote: "In fact, 'nice' might be the only word to accurately describle Newton-John's two-hour performance Thursday night as she opened a two-night stand at Trump Taj Mahal Casino Resort. It was wholesome, it was earnest, it was nostalgic, it was inspirational, it was sugar-sweet".

Opening act
Jim Brickman (selected dates)

Set list
"Xanadu"
"Magic"
"Don't Stop Believin'"
"Precious Love"
"Sam"
"Let Me Be There"
"Have You Never Been Mellow"
"If Not for You"
"Jolene"
"The Long and Winding Road"
"Take Me Home, Country Roads"
"The Flower That Shattered the Stone"
"Over the Rainbow"
"(They Long to Be) Close to You"
"Not Gonna Give Into It"
"Please Mr. Please"
"Don't Cry for Me Argentina"
"You're the One That I Want"
"Summer Nights"
"Hopelessly Devoted to You"
"Suddenly"
"Don't Cut Me Down"
"If You Love Me (Let Me Know)"
"Back with a Heart"
"Twist of Fate" (selected dates)
"Physical"
"I Honestly Love You"

Broadcasts and recordings

The concerts audio of 26 and 27 August 1999, at Trump Taj Mahal, was recorded for a commercial release. One Woman's Live Journey is Newton-John third live album and was released in 2000, on CD and DVD-Audio. The album only charted in the Newton-John native country, Australia. The tourbook, titled as Olivia: One Woman's Journey features several pictures of Newton-John across the years, with personal comments by herself.

Tour dates

Festivals and other miscellaneous performances
a This concert was a part of the California Mid-States Fair.

Personnel
Olivia Newton-John – vocals
Lindsay Field –  backing vocals
Lisa Edwards –  backing vocals
Angus Burchall – drums
Joe Creighton – bass, backing vocals
Stuart Fraiser – guitar
Steve Williams – saxophone, harmonica

References

External links
 Tour dates at Newton-John's official website

1998 concert tours
1999 concert tours
Olivia Newton-John concert tours